Kuttram 23 is a 2017 Indian Tamil-language action thriller film written and directed by Arivazhagan. Themed on medical crimes, the film stars Arun Vijay and Mahima Nambiar, with Vamsi Krishna, Aravind Akash, Amit Bhargav, Abhinaya,  and Thambi Ramaiah, amongst others, in supporting roles. Produced by Inder Kumar along with Arun Vijay, the soundtrack album and background score for the film is composed by Vishal Chandrasekhar. The film was released worldwide on 3 March 2017 and was a super hit at the box office.

Plot
Jessica arrives at the St. Thomas Church in Villivakkam, outskirts of Chennai where she confesses her sins to a priest. The priest is murdered, but Jessica is abducted.

In Chennai, ACP Vetrimaaran IPS is celebrating his elder brother Aravind and sister-in-law Abhinaya's wedding anniversary. Everyone in the family is happy except for Vetri's mother, who berates Abhinaya for not bearing her a grandchild despite many years of marriage life. However, after undergoing treatment by a famous fertility specialist, Dr. Tulsi, Abhinaya finally becomes pregnant. While the rest of his family is in a celebratory mode, Vetri notices Abhinaya being moody most of the time.

Meanwhile, Vetri is put in charge of Jessica's abduction case assisted by Thirupathi where he suspects that there is a connection between the priest's murder and Jessica's disappearance. Vetri and Thirupathi visit Thendral, a teacher at the local pre-school who was the first witness to the corpse of the dead priest. Thendral's family moves out of the city's outskirts and unknowingly into the apartment right opposite Vetri's home. Only then does Vetri realize that her family is finding a groom for her, and people will start questioning her morals if the police keeps on visiting her.

Eventually, Thendral reveals that she saw 2  cars that day outside the church; one belonging to Jessica and another black minivan driven by a group of mysterious young men. Thendral is attacked by a group of thugs driving a similar minivan. She is saved by Vetri. After this incident, Vetri and Thendral start dating and fall for each other. At around the same time, Jessica's body is found at a landfill site, and it is revealed that she was pregnant at the time of her murder. Her husband, the director of a leading TV channel, simply claims that they have only recently tried to conceive.

Vetri's investigation soon leads them to a petrol bunk close to the church. The CCTV captured the men in the black minivan. At the same time, Thendral notices that the men are outside her apartment. She phones Vetri, who instructs her to shut all the doors and stay indoors. When Vetri shows up, the men have gone. When he goes home, he finds that Abhinaya has hanged herself to death. The police concludes that Abhinaya committed suicide, since there was no sign of intrusion.

Thendral reveals that one of her doctor friends treated Aravind and Abhinaya and that Aravind is infertile, leading Thendral to theorize that Abhinaya might have been unfaithful. While going through Abhinaya's postmortem report, Vetri realizes that her body contained traces of clomiphene, similar to Jessica's body. After talking to the coroner, Vetri learns that there is a third young woman who matches this pattern. Realizing that Aravind might be hiding something, Vetri confronts him, when he and Abhinaya had opted for an artificial insemination using his own sperm.

Vetri visits Tulsi at her hospital and sees that on inquiry, he realizes that she is hiding something. He requests for all the files on patients who have undergone artificial insemination at the hospital. He also notices that Kousalya, a famous TV artist, gets treated successfully in that hospital. While studying the files, Vetri realizes that the documents on artificial insemination patients had an unusual watermark with the number 23 on them. The following day, Vetri visits Kousalya and her husband to question them on whether they have been blackmailed recently.

Although the couple denies everything, Vetri asks his team to tap their phones, especially incoming calls. True enough, Kousalya receives a call instructing her to pay a huge sum of money in exchange for not revealing information that might destroy her career. Vetri and his team shadow the young couple the next day. Kousalya and her husband are seen withdrawing money from a bank and driving through a busy street. Just then, a young man covering his face forcefully enters their car and takes the money. By the time Vetri catches up with them, the man has escaped. However, Vetri's men had placed a tracker on the bag containing the money.

Vetri easily tracks the person to his apartment and manages to overpower him for interrogation. The person reveals himself as Gaurav and is part of a gang that has been blackmailing several women in the city who have legally undergone artificial insemination at Tulsi's hospital. One of their first victims was Jessica, who is an ardent cricket fan. She had hired Gaurav's gang to get hold of her favorite cricket player's sperm in order to conceive his child. However, she soon felt guilty. Feeling that they might get caught, Gaurav killed her and the priest who heard her confession.

The next woman was the politician's daughter-in-law, who slit her own wrists at her baby shower. Her father in law  wanted his grandson to be a politician like him. So, he arranged for her to be inseminated with his own sperm. Finally, there was Abhinaya, who learned from Gaurav's partner John Matthew that Tulsi lied about using Aravind's sperm and instead inseminated her with someone else's sperm. Abhinaya finally goes back to Tulsi to get an abortion. When Gaurav's gang learns about this, they came to Vetri's house that day when Thendral saw them. They then killed Abhinaya and arranged for it to look like a suicide. After the confession, Vetri kills him in a fit of anger.

As Vetri and his men head over to the hospital to arrest Tulsi, he suddenly remembers that few years ago, a man named John Matthew reported that his wife had gone missing. John was upset that his wife did not want to bear his children and instead wanted an artificial insemination with a much more superior male. A few days later, she was found dead. Since then, John had gone missing. Vetri had one of his men look into John's disappearance. Meanwhile, John Matthew is shown to be working as a lab assistant at Tulsi's sperm bank and was the one who had been manipulating the donor's records and passing on the information to Gaurav.

When Tulsi and her husband threaten to have him exposed, he swiftly kills them and leaves. Later that night, Vetri gets a call from John, who has abducted Thendral. Vetri manages to track John down and save Thendral. However, John is a trained fighter and beats up Vetri. John reveals that he arranged for Abhinaya to be inseminated with his own sperm. When he learned that she was planning an abortion, he could not accept it and had Gaurav kill her. While John is ranting, Vetri manages to overpower and then kill him. The next day, Vetri and Thendral discuss about the misuse of medical advancements in people and the importance of adopting orphans in the media.

Cast

Arun Vijay as Assistant Commissioner Vetrimaaran IPS
Mahima Nambiar as Thendral, a preschool teacher and Vetri's love interest (voice dubbed by M. M. Manasi)
Thambi Ramaiah as SI Thirupathi, a man who assists Vetri in his case
Amit Bhargav as Aravind, Vetri's brother who opted for an artificial insemination with Abhinaya
Abhinaya as Sri Abhinaya, Vetri's sister-in-law who gets blackmailed and later killed by John
Vamsi Krishna as John Matthew, the main antagonist
Vijayakumar as Commissioner Kumarasamy IPS
Aravind Akash as Gaurav, John's crime partner
Misha Ghoshal as Jessica, an ardent cricket fan who gets abducted
Neelima Rani as Kousalya, a TV artist whose money gets stolen by Gaurav
Kalyani Natarajan as Dr. Tulsi, a fertility specialist who gets murdered by John
Suja Varunee as John's wife, who had gone missing and wanted to bear artificial insemination with another male
K. S. G. Venkatesh as Thendral's father
Aishwarya
Meera Krishnan as Sri Abhinaya's mother
Stunt Silva
 Leo Sivadass as petrol bunk guy

Production 
In January 2016, Arun Vijay and director Arivazhagan announced that they would collaborate to work on a "high-octane action thriller" with a medical backdrop, which would begin in the following months. The script was developed in early 2016, with the story being inspired by a novel by writer Rajesh Kumar, which in turn was based on real events. Arivazhagan developed Rajesh Kumar's novel into a screenplay within 15 days of gaining approval from the writer to use the story. A formal launch event was held in March 2016, with Arun Vijay announced that the venture will be produced by his friend, Inder Kumar, under Redhan The Cinema People banner. Due to Arivazhagan's regular collaborator S. Thaman was busy with other commitments and unable to collaborate with him again at that time, Vishal Chandrasekhar was instead signed as the music composer. During April 2016, the team shot scenes in the dumpyard of Pallikaranai with Arun Vijay reportedly working for 36 hours in a single stretch. Following the completion of the schedule, 30% of the film was revealed to be over. Actress Mahima Nambiar joined the cast to play the lead female role, while Vamsi Krishna and Amit Bhargav were selected for further supporting roles. The shoot continued throughout mid-2016, with the team filming climax scenes during nighttime in the Padur region of Chennai. The team finished further sequences in July 2016, while taking a day off to give technicians the opportunity to watch the Rajinikanth-starrer Kabali (2016) on the day of the release. The shoot finished thereafter, taking 45 days from start to finish and costing 3.5 crore rupees, and a theatrical trailer was released during September 2016.

Soundtrack

The music and film score was composed by Vishal Chandrasekhar, working with director Arivazhagan for the first time. The audio launch of Kuttram 23 was held on 1 September 2016 at Satyam Cinemas in Chennai, with the event being attended by several film personalities from the Tamil film industry.

Release
The producers initially announced a release date of 14 January 2017 but later opted out as they failed to get as many screens as they had desired, owing to the proposed release of several films, including Bairavaa (2017). Prior to the official release, a premiere was held for media personalities, and the film drew positive reviews. Kuttram 23 was subsequently released on 3 March 2017 and won critical acclaim. The satellite rights of the film were sold to Zee Tamil. The Hindustan Times noted, "it is brilliantly scripted and directed – and of course ably acted out by especially Vijay". The Deccan Chronicle noted it was "a welcomed relief from the recent drab of Kollywood", while The New Indian Express stated it had a "coherent screenplay which could have been better". Sify.com's reviewer wrote the film was "a good example of an entertaining cop thriller" adding "this sharply written slick investigative thriller, comes as a huge relief at a time where Tamil audiences are bombarded with several middling movies of big stars" and that "the film is also a perfect case study on how good writing and a technically sound team can offer quality entertainment, which is a rarity in Kollywood". Likewise, Sreedhar Pillai of FirstPost wrote "Kuttram 23 has a compelling story and is packaged in an entertaining format by Arivazhagan" and that "it is one of the better movies in recent times". Following the release of the film, several Tamil film personalities including Rajinikanth and Shankar publicly appreciated the film.

The film gained more screens following positive reviews, and it subsequently went on to become Arun Vijay's most profitable film till date.

References

External links
 

2017 films
2010s Tamil-language films
Films based on Indian novels
Films based on crime novels
Films set in Chennai
Films shot in Chennai
Fictional portrayals of the Tamil Nadu Police
Action films based on actual events
Crime films based on actual events
Thriller films based on actual events
Indian action thriller films
Indian crime thriller films
Indian crime action films
Indian police films
2017 action thriller films
2017 crime action films
2017 crime thriller films
2010s police procedural films
Films directed by Arivazhagan Venkatachalam
Indian serial killer films
Films scored by Vishal Chandrasekhar